The Goethe-Institut Award is a biennial literary prize presented by the Society of Authors and the Goethe Institut, London, for the best translation of a text from German to English. Past winners include Kay McBurney, Katy Derbyshire, and Imogen Taylor.

About 
The Goethe-Institut Award was established by the Society of Authors in partnership with the Geothe Institut's London branch. The Society of Authors is a British trade union of writers, illustrators, and translators, which, among other activities, awards a number of literary prizes for writing and translation, including the Betty Trask Prize,  TA First Translation Prize,   Banipal Prize, and others. The Goethe Institut is a non-profit German cultural association, aimed at promoting the German language outside Germany.

The Goethe-Institut Award was established in 2010, and replaced the German Embassy Award for Translators, which was presented by the German Embassy in London. It is presented to British translators, and is awarded for translations from German to English. The prize consists of a cash award of €1,000, and includes attendance at the Leipzig Book Fair and the International Translators' Colloquium in Berlin. It is awarded once every two years. It is focused on early-career translators, and has been described as a "top award for new translators" by the Faculty of Medieval and Modern Languages, University of Oxford.

Recipients

References 

Society of Authors awards
Translation awards
Awards established in 2010
German literary awards
English literary awards